Marvelous Angelique
(French: Merveilleuse Angélique) is a 1965 historical romantic adventure film directed by Bernard Borderie. It is the second film in the Angélique series, based upon the novels by Anne and Serge Golon, and a sequel to Angélique, Marquise des Anges. It was made as a co-production between France, Italy and West Germany.

It was made at the Billancourt Studios in Paris and the Cinecitta Studios in Rome. Location shooting took place at Versailles. The sets were designed by the art director René Moulaert.

Synopsis
After the execution of Jeoffrey de Peyrac, Angélique finds refuge at the Cour des Miracles and the boss Calembredaine; he turns out to be her childhood friend and first love Nicolas. With his help she finds her children. After a fight between two rival gangs, Nicolas is shot and Angélique is arrested and sent to the Châtelet. She asks the captain to let her go rescue her children, he agrees but she has to come back to spend the night with him. Angélique goes to the headquarters of the Grand Coërse and rescues her children. She brings them to Barbe and asks her to take care of them because she has a debt to pay. Angélique returns to the Châtelet where the captain is waiting for her. He tries to kiss her but they struggle and he falls down. She escapes and flees to Barbe who now works in an old run-down inn called "Le coq Hardi".

After persuading the owner 'Maître Bourjus' to employ her, Angélique renames the inn "Le masque rouge"; it is a big hit in Paris. One day she meets her old enemy, Monsieur, brother of the king, accompanied by his noblemen. A tragedy occurs, "Le masque rouge" burns to the ground and Angélique swears revenge. She calls on her friend Claude le Petit aka "Le poète crotté". He writes pamphlets in which they accuse the noblemen surrounding Monsieur.

The king disapproves of what his brother did but he doesn't like what the poet is doing and has him hanged, another death on Angelique's conscience. He sends his best policeman to her, the former lawyer of Jeoffrey, Desgrez, who realizes she is planning to kill herself.  He promises her a license to make and sell chocolate and 50.000 livres as compensation for the loss of "Le masque rouge", on the condition that she accepts that the Poet Crotte's death was not her fault and that she stops publishing the remaining pamphlets so that Monsieur's name isn't mentioned.

In her new establishment she then encounters her cousin Philippe de Plessis-Bellières. They have a passionate affair, but Angélique wants him to marry her so she blackmails him with an old secret. Eventually Philippe asks her to be his wife and he introduces her to the court.

Cast
 Michèle Mercier as Angélique Sancé de Monteloup
 Giuliano Gemma as Nicolas Merlot aka Calembredaine
 Claude Giraud as Philippe de Plessis-Bellières
 Jean Rochefort as François Desgrez
 Jean-Louis Trintignant as Claude le Petit, Le poète croté
 Noël Roquevert as Bourjus
 Jacques Toja as Louis XIV
 Charles Regnier as Conan Bécher
 Robert Porte as Monsieur brother of the king
 Philippe Lemaire as De Vardes
 François Maistre as Prince de Condé
 Claire Maurier as Ninon de Lenclos
 Roberto as Barcarole
 Denise Provence as Barbe
 Ernst Schröder as capitaine du Châtelet
 Rosalba Neri as La Polak 
 Henri Cogan as Cul-de-Bois
 Serge Marquand as Jactance
 Gino Martunaro as Rodogone L'Egyptien
 Michaël Munzeras  Beau Garçon
 Renate Ewert as Margot
 Élisabeth Ercy as Rosine
 Patrick Lemaître as Flipot
 Guido Alberti as Le grand Mathieu
 Jacques Hilling as Mr Molines
 Dominique Viriot as Linot
 Pietro Tordi as Le Grand Coërse
 Robert Hoffmann as chevalier de Lorraine
    
Voice dubbing:
 Jacques Thébault: voice of Giuliano Gemma
 Philippe Noiret: voix d'Ernst Schroëder
 Rosy Varte: voice of Rosalba Neri

References

Filmography Angélique 
1964: Angélique, Marquise des Anges de Bernard Borderie starring Michèle Mercier, Robert Hossein, Jean Rochefort
1964: Marvelous Angelique by Bernard Borderie starring Michèle Mercier, Claude Giraud, Jean Rochefort
1965: Angelique and the King by Bernard Borderie starring Michèle Mercier, Jean Rochefort
1967: Untamable Angelique by Bernard Borderie starring Michèle Mercier, Robert Hossein
1968: Angelique and the Sultan by Bernard Borderie starring Michèle Mercier, Robert Hossein

Bibliography
 Klossner, Michael. The Europe of 1500-1815 on Film and Television: A Worldwide Filmography of Over 2550 Works, 1895 Through 2000. McFarland & Company, 2002.

External links
 
 Angélique Marquise des Anges : photos, etc.
 La Marchesa degli Angeli

1965 films
1960s historical romance films
French historical romance films
Italian historical romance films
West German films
Films directed by Bernard Borderie
Films set in the 1670s
Films produced by Raymond Borderie
Films based on French novels
Films based on historical novels
Films based on romance novels
French films about revenge
French sequel films
Gloria Film films
Films shot at Billancourt Studios
Films shot at Cinecittà Studios
German historical romance films
1960s Italian films
1960s French films
1960s German films
French epic films